

355001–355100 

|-id=022
| 355022 Triman ||  || "Triman" is the competition nickname of Martin Peer (born 1984). He is an electronics engineer passionate about triathlons. He is also curious about unusual activity in the sky during his late-night workouts. || 
|-id=029
| 355029 Herve ||  || Jacquinot Herve (born 1953), a very enthusiastic French amateur astronomer. || 
|}

355101–355200 

|-bgcolor=#f2f2f2
| colspan=4 align=center | 
|}

355201–355300 

|-id=276
| 355276 Leclair ||  || Jean-Marie Leclair (1697–1764), was a Baroque violinist and composer. He is considered to have founded the French violin school. || 
|}

355301–355400 

|-bgcolor=#f2f2f2
| colspan=4 align=center | 
|}

355401–355500 

|-bgcolor=#f2f2f2
| colspan=4 align=center | 
|}

355501–355600 

|-bgcolor=#f2f2f2
| colspan=4 align=center | 
|}

355601–355700 

|-bgcolor=#f2f2f2
| colspan=4 align=center | 
|}

355701–355800 

|-id=704
| 355704 Wangyinglai ||  || Wang Yinglai (1907–2001), an academician of Chinese Academy of Sciences, is a founder of biochemical research in China. He was the first to organize and complete the biosynthesis of bovine insulin and yeast alanine transfer ribonucleic acid in the world. || 
|}

355801–355900 

|-bgcolor=#f2f2f2
| colspan=4 align=center | 
|}

355901–356000 

|-bgcolor=#f2f2f2
| colspan=4 align=center | 
|}

References 

355001-356000